To celebrate its 60th anniversary circa 1995, Penguin Books released several boxed sets of "Penguin 60s", miniature books about sixty pages in length.  The books were also sold individually.

The main set, with black spines, contained 60 "classic" works. The UK set with orange spines ( / ) focused on 20th century or contemporary writers and contained 60 books. A similar set of 60 orange spine books was released for the American market with 13 books in common with the UK set. Smaller, ten item sets focusing on biography/autobiography, travel and cookery were also issued.  A children's set was released, consisting of 30 volumes.

Further books in the series were planned but appear to have been cancelled. Thirty Obituaries of Wisden selected by Matthew Engel was published but did not appear in any of the other sets of books. Ten orange spine books were released as a limited edition boxed set sold through Blackwell's bookshops in the UK with Stephen King's Umney's Last Case the only title appearing in the US orange spine editions. The other 9 titles in the Blackwells set were unique titles that did not appear in the other sets (Surprised by Summer by David Lodge, Postcards from Summer by Peter Mayle, Lizzie Borden by Angela Carter, The Girl Who Loved Graveyards by P.D. James, Expulsion from Paradise by Howard Jacobson, Meeting Bilal by Esther Freud, The Rock of Crack as Big as the Ritz by Will Self, The Pocket Watchmaker by Richard Dawkins and Scenes from the Dwarf by Rob Grant and Doug Naylor). 
Another 19 titles appear to have been planned as they are listed at the back of the biography and travel editions but do not appear to have been published.

The American orange spine set and UK orange spine set only had 13 books that were in common. They are:

 Hans Christian Andersen - The Emperor's New Clothes
 Anton Chekov - The Black Monk and Peasants
 Roald Dahl - Lamb to the Slaughter and Other Stories
 Sir Arthur Conan Doyle - The Man with the Twisted Lip and The Adventure of the Devil's Foot
 Graham Greene - Under the Garden
 Rudyard Kipling - Baa, Baa, Black Sheep and The Gardener
 Gabriel Garcia Marquez - Bon Voyage, Mr President and Other Stories
 Herman Melville - Bartleby and The Lightning-rod Man
 Michel De Montaigne - Four Essays
 John Mortimer - Rumpole and the Younger Generation
 Edgar Allan Poe - The Pit and the Pendulum and Other Stories
 Edith Wharton - Madame de Treymes
 Oscar Wilde - The Happy Prince and Other Stories

Series

Black set (60)
()
Jane Austen - The history of England
 Apollonius of Rhodes - Jason and the Argonauts
Aristophanes - Lysistrata
 Balzac - The Atheist's Mass
 Boccaccio - Ten Tales from the Decameron
Beowulf and Grendel
Buddha's Teachings
 James Boswell - Meeting Dr Johnson
 Matsuo Bashō - Haiku
Thomas Carlyle - On Great Men
Charlotte Perkins Gilman - The Yellow Wallpaper
 Charlotte Brontë - Mina Laury
 Cao Xueqin - Dream of the Red Chamber
 Miguel de Cervantes - The Jealous Extremaduran
Castiglione - Etiquette for Renaissance Gentlemen
 Joseph Conrad - The Secret Sharer
 Charles Darwin - The Galapagos Islands
 Dostoyevsky - The Gentle Spirit
 Bernal Díaz del Castillo - The Betrayal of Montezuma
 Frederick Douglass - The Education of Frederick Douglass
 Dante - The First Three Circles of Hell
 De Quincey - The pleasures and pains of opium
 Daniel Defoe - A Visitation of the Plague
 Benjamin Franklin - The Means and Manner of Obtaining Virtue
 Flaubert- A Simple Heart
 Gibbon - Reflections of the Fall of Rome
Gilgamesh and Enkidu
 Goethe - Letters from Italy
 George Eliot - The Lifted Veil
Henry David Thoreau - Civil Disobedience
 Henry James - The Lessons of the Master
 Homer - The Rage of Achilles
 Homer - The Voyages of Odysseus
 Franz Kafka - The Judgement and In the Penal Colony
Krishna's Dialogue on the Soul
 Kate Chopin - The Kiss
 Heinrich von Kleist - The Marquise of O
Livy - Hannibal's Crossing of the Alps
 Machiavelli - The Art of War
 Thomas Malory - The Death of King Arthur
 Maupassant - Boule de Suif
 Nietzsche - Zarathustra's Discourses
 Ovid - Orpheus in the Underworld
 Edgar Allan Poe - The Murders in the Rue Morgue
Plato - Phaedrus
 Rimbaud - A Season in Hell
 Jean-Jacques Rousseau - Meditations of a Solitary Walker
 Saint Augustine - Confessions of a Sinner
 Robert Louis Stevenson - Dr. Jekyll and Mr. Hyde
 Thomas à Kempis - Counsels on the Spiritual Life
Two Viking Romances
 Tolstoy - The Death of Ivan Ilyich
Tales of Cú Chulainn
 Turgenev - Three Sketches from a Hunter Diary
 Mark Twain - The Man That Corrupted Hadleyburg
 Tacitus - Nero and the Burning of Rome
 Vasari - Lives of Three Renaissance Artists
 Edith Wharton - Souls Belated
 Oscar Wilde - The Portrait of Mr W. H.
 Walt Whitman - Song of Myself

Orange set (UK titles)
()
 Martin Amis - God's Dice 
 Hans Christian Andersen - The Emperor's New Clothes
 Marcus Aurelius - Meditations
 James Baldwin - Sonny's Blues
 Ambrose Bierce - An Occurrence at Owl Creek Bridge
 Dirk Bogarde - from Le Pigeonnier 
 William Boyd - Killing Lizards
 Poppy Z Brite - His Mouth Will Taste of Wormwood 
 Italo Calvino - Ten Italian Folktales 
 Albert Camus - Summer 
 Truman Capote - First and Last 
 Raymond Chandler - Goldfish 
 Anton Chekhov - The Black Monk 
 Roald Dahl - Lamb to the Slaughter 
 Elizabeth David - I'll be with you in the Squeezing of a Lemon 
 The Seven Voyages of Sinbad the Sailor
 Karen Blixen - The Dreaming Child 
 Arthur Conan Doyle - The Man with the Twisted Lip 
 Dick Francis - Racing Classics 
 Sigmund Freud - Five Lectures on Psycho-Analysis 
 Kahlil Gibran - Prophet, Madman, Wanderer
 Stephen Jay Gould - Adam's Navel
 Alasdair Gray - Five Letters from an Eastern Empire
 Graham Greene - Under the Garden
 James Herriot - Seven Yorkshire Tales
 Patricia Highsmith - Little Tales of Misogyny
 M. R. James and R. L. Stevenson - The Haunted Dolls House
 Rudyard Kipling - Baa Baa Black Sheep
 Penelope Lively - A Long Night at Abu Simbel
 Katherine Mansfield - The Escape
 Gabriel Garcia Marquez - Bon Voyage, Mr President
 Patrick McGrath - The Angel
 Herman Melville - Bartleby
 Spike Milligan - Gunner Milligan, 954024
 Michel de Montaigne - Four Essays
 Jan Morris - from The Four Corners
 John Mortimer - Rumpole and the Younger Generation
 R. K. Narayan - Tales from Malgudi
 Anaïs Nin - A Model 
 Frank O'Connor - The Genius 
 George Orwell - Pages from a Scullion's Diary 
 Camille Paglia - Sex and Violence, or Nature and Art 
 Sara Paretsky - A Taste of Life 
 Edgar Allan Poe - The Pit and the Pendulum 
 Miss Read - Village Christmas 
 Jean Rhys - Let Them Call It Jazz 
 Damon Runyon - The Snatching of Bookie Bob 
 Saki - The Secret Sin of Septimus Brope 
 Will Self - Scale 
 Georges Simenon - Death of a Nobody 
 Muriel Spark - The Portobello Road 
 Robert Louis Stevenson - The Pavilion on the Links 
 Paul Theroux - Down the Yangtze 
 William Trevor - Matilda's England 
 Mark Tully - Ram Chander's Story 
 John Updike - Friends from Philadelphia 
 Eudora Welty - Why I Live at the P. O. 
 Edith Wharton - Madame de Treymes 
 Oscar Wilde - The Happy Prince 
 Virginia Woolf - Killing the Angel in the House

Orange set (US Titles)
Louisa May Alcott - An Old Fashioned Thanksgiving
Hans Christian Andersen - The Emperor's New Clothes
J. M. Barrie - Peter Pan in Kensington Gardens
William Blake - Songs of Innocence and Experience
Geoffrey Chaucer - The Wife of Bath and Other Canterbury Tales
Anton Chekov - The Black Monk and Peasants
Samuel Taylor Coleridge - The Rime of the Ancient Mariner and Other Poems
Colette - Gigi
Joseph Conrad - Youth: A Narrative
Roald Dahl - Lamb to the Slaughter and Other Stories
Robertson Davies - A Gathering of Ghost Stories
Fydor Dostoevsky - The Grand Inquisitor
Sir Arthur Conan Doyle - The Man with the Twisted Lip and The Adventure of the Devil's Foot
Ralph Waldo Emerson - Nature
Omer Englebert - The Lives of the Saints
Fannie Merritt Farmer - Selections from the Original 1896 Boston Cooking-School Cookbook
Edward Fitzgerald - The Rubaiyat of Omar Khayyam
Robert Frost - The Road Not Taken and Other Poems
Gabriel Garcia Marquez - Bon Voyage, Mr President and Other Stories
Nikolai Gogol - The Overcoat and The Nose
Graham Greene - Under the Garden
Jacob And Wilhelm Grimm - Grimms' Fairy Tales
Nathaniel Hawthorne - Young Goodman Brown and Other Stories
O. Henry - The Gift of the Magi and Other Stories
Washington Irving - Rip Van Winkle and the Legend of Sleepy Hollow
Henry James - Daisy Miller: A Comedy
V. S. Vernon Jones - Aesop's Fables
James Joyce - The Dead
Garrison Keillor - Truckstop and Other Lake Wobegon Stories
Jack Kerouac - San Francisco Blues
Stephen King - Umney's Last Case
Rudyard Kipling - Baa, Baa, Black Sheep and The Gardener
Lao Tzu - Tao Te Ching
D. H. Lawrence - Love Among the Haystacks
Abraham Lincoln - The Gettysburg Address and Other Speeches
Jack London - To Build a Fire and Other Stories
Herman Melville - Bartleby and The Lightning-rod Man
A. A. Milne - Winnie-the-Pooh and his Friends
Michel De Montaigne - Four Essays
John Mortimer - Rumpole and the Younger Generation
Thomas Paine - The Crisis
Dorothy Parker - Big Blonde and other stories
Edgar Allan Poe - The Pit and the Pendulum and Other Stories
Edgar Allan Poe, Ambrose Pierce and Robert Louis Stevenson- Three Tales of Horror
Franklin D. Roosevelt - Fireside Chats
William Shakespeare - Sixty Sonnets
John Steinbeck - The Chrysanthemums and Other Stories
Peter Straub - Blue Rose
Paul Theroux - The Greenest Island
Henry David Thoreau - Walking
John Thorn - Baseball: Our Game
Leo Tolstoy - Master and Man
Mark Twain - The Notorious Jumping Frog of Calaveras County and Other Stories (5 stories)
H.G. Wells - The Time Machine
Edith Wharton - Madame de Treymes
Oscar Wilde - The Happy Prince and Other Stories
The Declaration of Independence and the Constitution of the United States
Mother Goose - Mother Goose
The Revelation of St. John the Divine: Holy Bible KJV
Teachings of Jesus : Holy Bible KJV

Biography set (10)
()
Richard Ellmann - The Trial of Oscar Wilde
Laurie Lee - The War in Spain
Dirk Bogarde - Coming of Age
Anthony Burgess - Childhood
Vladimir Nabokov - Now Remember
Marianne Faithfull - Year One
Barry Humphries - Less is More Please
Lytton Strachey - Florence Nightingale
Katharine Hepburn - Little Me
Blake Morrison - Camp Cuba

Cookery set (10)
()
Keith Floyd - Hot and Spicy Floyd
Rick Stein - Fresh from the Sea
Margaret Visser - More than Meets the Eye
Elizabeth David - Peperonata and other Italian Dishes
Nigel Slater - 30-Minute Suppers
Helge Rubinstein - Chocolate Parfait
Jane Grigson - Puddings
Sophie Grigson - From Sophie's Table
Claudia Roden - Ful Medames and other Vegetarian Dishes
Lindsey Bareham - The LIttle Book of Big Soups

Travel set (10)
()
Jan Morris - Scenes from Havian Life
Gavin Young - Something of Samoa
Colin Thubron - SmarkandPaul Theroux - Slow Trains to SimlaMark Shand - Elephant TalesRedmond O'Hanlon - A River in BorneoAlexander Frater - Where the Dawn Comes Up Like ThunderPatrick Leigh Fermor - Loose as the WindKaren Blixen - From the Ngong HillsMark Tully - Beyond PurdahChildren's set (30)
()
Roger Lancelyn Green - Robin Hood and his Merry MenKing Arthurs CourtFour Great Greek MythsClassic Nonsense VerseAlf Proysen - Mrs Pepperpot Turns DetectivePhilip Ridley - The Hooligan's ShampooN J Dawood - Ali Baba & The Forty ThievesPaul Jennings - Three Quirky TailsMark Twain - Tom Sawyer's Pirate AdventureAllan Ahlberg - The Night TrainJoan Aiken - Dead Man's LaneAstrid Lindgren - The Amazing Pippi LongstockingTove Jansson - Moomintrolls and FriendsLewis Carroll - Tailes from Alice in WonderlandMargaret Mahy - The Midnight StoryPhilippa Pearce - At the river GatesDick King-Smith - The Clockwork MouseSir Arthur Conan Doyle - Sherlock Holmes and the Speckled BandAnne Fine - Keep it in the FamilyMichael Rosen - Smacking my lipsBrothers Grimm - Tom ThumbJon Scieszka - The Great Time Warp AdventureRoald Dahl - The Great Mouse PlotThe Pied Piper of HamelinClassic Ghost StoriesL. M. Montgomery - Anne at Green GablesHans Christian Andersen - The Little MermaidTerry Jones - The Dragon on the RoofRudyard Kipling - Tales from The Jungle BookPenelope Lively - Lost Dog''

Lists of books
Penguin Books book series